The Astra RNR1 is a Group 6 sports prototype race car, designed, developed, and built by amateur British racing driver Roger Nathan, in 1969. It debuted at the 1969 1000 km of Nürburgring, where it was driven by Roger Nathan and Mike Beckwith. It competed in sports car racing between 1969 and 1976, where it found relative, but respectable success. It scored 15 race wins (including 1 additional class win), achieved 27 podium finishes, and clinched 6 pole positions. It powered by either a  Coventry Climax, or a  Ford-Cosworth FVA, naturally-aspirated four-cylinder engine.

References

Sports prototypes
Cars of England
Sports racing cars
1960s cars